Contamine-sur-Arve (literally Contamine on Arve) is a commune in the Haute-Savoie department and Auvergne-Rhône-Alpes region of eastern France.

See also
Communes of the Haute-Savoie department

References

Communes of Haute-Savoie